Suad al-Ali (سعاد العلي) was an Iraqi human rights campaigner. She was the president of al-Wid al-Alami For Human Rights. She was murdered in the city of Basra, Iraq, on September 25, 2018.

Al-Ali was a leader of the 2018 protests in the city of Basra against corruption and economic, political and social problems.

Al-Wid Al-Alami for Human Rights is an NGO concentrating on "women's rights and demands” and "children's rights and many activities for the revival of childhood", according to the Gulf Centre for Human Rights.

According to Frontline Defenders, "On 25 September at 3:30 p.m., in the Al-Abbasiyah district in the city centre of Basra, an unidentified man shot Su’ad Al-Ali in the back of her head while she was getting into her car." A video showing her killing by unknown attackers was posted online and reported by the BBC.

Ali al-Bayati from the Iraqi High Commission for Human Rights (IHCHR) condemned the killing of Al-Ali, and called on the Iraqi government to protect civil society organisations and human rights activists.

References 

2018 deaths
Year of birth missing
People murdered in Iraq
Assassinated activists
Female murder victims
Violence against women in Iraq